Thomas Tuohy CBE (7 November 1917 – 12 March 2008) was deputy to the general manager at the Windscale nuclear facility when a major fire erupted on 10 October 1957. He was the leading participant in efforts to put out the fire which was emitting radioactive contamination into the air, and so played a key role in minimising Britain's worst nuclear disaster.

Early life and career

Tuohy was born in Wallsend and educated at St Cuthbert's High School, Newcastle-upon-Tyne, and Reading University.

During World War II he worked for the Royal Ordnance as a chemist, and in 1946 joined the nuclear industry, becoming deputy general manager of Windscale in 1957.

Windscale fire

On 10 October 1957 his boss phoned him at home where he was nursing a family sick with flu, saying: "Come at once. Pile number one is on fire." Leaving his wife and two children, he told them to stay indoors and keep all the windows closed.

At the factory he discarded his radiation recording badge, so that no one could tell him that he had exceeded permitted radiation dose limits, and made repeated inspections directly into the 80 ft pile. Over the next few hours he was instrumental in directing the efforts which eventually brought the blaze under control.

Despite his excessive exposure to radiation that day, Tuohy lived to the age of 90.

In 1990, the first of three BBC documentaries on the incident was shown. Titled Our Reactor is on Fire, the documentary featured interviews with key plant workers, including Tom Tuohy.

In 2007, the BBC produced another documentary about the accident titled "Windscale: Britain’s Biggest Nuclear Disaster", which investigates the history of the first British nuclear facility and its role in the development of nuclear weapons. The documentary features interviews with key scientists and plant operators, including Tom Tuohy. The documentary suggests that the fire – the first fire in any nuclear facility – was caused by the relaxation of safety measures, as a result of pressure from the British government to quickly produce fissile materials for nuclear weapons.

See also
Windscale fire

References

External links
Windscale: Britain's Biggest Nuclear Disaster (2007) (TV)

People associated with nuclear power
1917 births
2008 deaths
People from Wallsend
People educated at St. Cuthbert's School
Alumni of the University of Reading
Commanders of the Order of the British Empire